Glenn Anthony Wessels (1895 – July 23, 1982) was a Cape Colony-born American painter, etcher, lithographer and arts educator. He was a professor at the California College of the Arts, Washington State University, and the University of California, Berkeley.

Life
Wessels was born in Cape Town, Cape Colony. He emigrated to the United States with his family as a child. He attended the University of California, and he was trained by Hans Hofmann in Munich, Germany.

Wessels was a painter, etcher, lithographer and arts educator. He was a professor at the California College of the Arts, Washington State University, and the University of California, Berkeley. Wessels was an artistic mentor to notable American painter Thomas Kinkade.

Wessels died on July 23, 1982. His artwork is in the permanent collections of the Fine Arts Museums of San Francisco, the Oakland Museum of California, and the Metropolitan Museum of Art in New York City.

References

1895 births
1982 deaths
People from Cape Town
Cape Colony emigrants to the United States
California College of the Arts faculty
Washington State University faculty
University of California, Berkeley faculty
American male painters
20th-century American painters
American etchers
American lithographers
20th-century American male artists
20th-century lithographers